Thaddeus John "T. John" Lesinski, (April 28, 1925 – August 13, 1996), was an American politician and judge from the U.S. state of Michigan.

Biography
Lesinski was born in Detroit, Michigan and lived in Detroit and Grosse Pointe Shores. He graduated from the University of Detroit Law School in 1950 and  served as warrant officer in the Maritime Service with action in the Atlantic, Pacific and Indian theatres during World War II. He was a member of the law firm of Lesinski & Paruk of Detroit and later a member of the law firm of Lesinski, Krall, Murphy & O'Neil of Detroit, Troy, and St. Clair Shores.

He served as a Democrat in the Michigan State House of Representatives, from Wayne County's 1st District, 1951–54, and Wayne County's 7th District, 1955-60.  He was elected and served as the 53rd lieutenant governor of Michigan from 1961 to 1965.  He served as Judge in the Michigan Court of Appeals 1st District from 1965 to 1976, being elected unopposed 1972 and resigned in 1976. He was a Catholic, a member of the American Bar Association, American Judicature Society, Polish National Alliance, Knights of Columbus, and Delta Theta Phi.

Lesinski was the 51st Lieutenant Governor of Michigan serving under Governors John Swainson and George W. Romney.  Although George W. Romney was a Republican, Lesinski was a Democrat, and defeated Romney's running mate, former Lieutenant Governor Clarence A. Reid, since the Governor and Lieutenant Governor were at that time elected separately in Michigan.  Reid himself won election as a Republican at the same time G. Mennen "Soapy" Williams, a Democrat, was elected governor.

In 1974 Judge Lesinski was the subject of Detroit Free Press articles by David Johnston (later David Cay Johnston) and Ellen Grezch exposing his lavish spending of taxpayer money. Judge Lesinski defended the spending, including buying fancier cars than the Michigan Supreme Court justices drove, saying "the dignity of the court" required top-of-the-line Oldsmobile 98s. Cartoonist Larry Wright mocked the judge as "Judge T. John Spendthrifski" in a series of political cartoons that ran from Jan. 21 to Jan. 25, 1974, in the Detroit Free Press.

T. John Lesinski died in 1996 at the age of 71.

References

The Political Graveyard
Biographies of Lieutenant Governors of Michigan, 1899 to Present and Listing of Lieutenant Governors, 1835-1898

1925 births
1996 deaths
Lieutenant Governors of Michigan
Politicians from Detroit
Michigan Democrats
University of Detroit Mercy alumni
American politicians of Polish descent
20th-century American judges
20th-century American politicians
People from Grosse Pointe Shores, Michigan
Michigan Court of Appeals judges